Kruzenshtern & Parohod is a Russophone Israel klezmer-rock band from Tel Aviv.

History
The band was formed in 2002. Its style was branded  "experimental jazz", "klezmercore" (a pun on "hardcore"), "ethno jazz", "avant-garde".

The band members were Igor Krutogolov: bass, voice, Ruslan Gross: clarinet, Guy Shechter: drums, Boris Martzinovsky: accordion. 

The name of the band is a pun recognizable by all post-Soviet Russophones. It is based on the fictional steamship "Admiral Ivan Fyodorovich Kruzenshtern" from the Prostokvashino animated film series, which is often as part of a catch phrase "Admiral I.F.Kruzenshtern, a man and a steamship", "pirated" from the title of a requiem poem by Vladimir Mayakovsky, To Comrade Nette, a Man and a Steamship. The fictional steamship is named after a Russian admiral and explorer Adam Johann von Krusenstern and the real sailing ship, the Kruzenshtern. 

Parohod means "steamboat" in Russian.

Discography
The Craft Of Primitive Klezmer (2003, Auris Media label)
Songs (2004)
Live in Karaganda (2004)
K&P / Vialka (split CD, Auris Media, 2006) 
K&P /IDM CD, Auris Media 2008 
The Craft Of Primitive Klezmer (2008)
Noize 2005 (2011)
Hidden Album (2012)
Hidden Album Volume II (2015)
HYMNS (2016)

References

External links

K&P website
Auris Media: -"The Craft of Primitive Klezmer"
A review at klezmershack.com

Israeli progressive rock groups
Klezmer groups